MacInTouch was a daily news and information website that provides independent coverage of Apple's Mac and iOS platforms, along with other topics such as security and privacy, networking, and technological innovation. MacInTouch's moderated forums provided technical analysis, problem-solving and news from the community. MacInTouch also provided product updates and occasional product reviews. The site shut down on August 30, 2021.

History
"MacInTouch" began as an independent print journal in 1985, originally published by Ford-LePage Inc., to provide news and information about Macintosh computers. The MacInTouch Home Page website, created by Ric Ford in 1994, was serving daily Mac news and information to more than a million people by 1998. It's noted as being one of several blog-style sites that predate the definition of a blog.

MacInTouch Inc. is incorporated in the Commonwealth of Massachusetts.

Other
In 1993, MacInTouch analysis of a bug in Apple's HFS file system prompted a nomination for a (non-existent)  "Pulitzer Prize in computer journalism."

In 1999, MacInTouch was noted in Linux Today for "Most tasteful and cool April foolishness: MacInTouch's transformation to MonkInTouch, complete with piano motif and lots of links to Thelonious Monk stuff."

In 2006, MacInTouch published an independent analysis of Apple Mac notebook reliability based on a survey of over 10,000 notebooks spanning 41 models.

In 2007, MacInTouch first reported a severe data-loss bug in Mac OS X 10.5 Leopard's Finder.

On 30 August 2021, Ric Ford (owner of MacInTouch) stated “As a business, MacInTouch is no longer viable, but thanks to supporters and special contributors, I hope to continue providing this website and subscriber/supporter services to the extent practical, which means some streamlining and project delays.”

External links
 MacInTouch Home Page

References

Macintosh websites
Publications established in 1985
Online computer magazines
American technology news websites
1985 establishments in the United States